"Too Much of a Good Thing" is a song written and recorded by American country music artist Alan Jackson.  It was released in June 2004 as the lead-off single from his album What I Do.  It peaked at number 5 on the United States Billboard Hot Country Singles & Tracks chart, and number 46 on the Billboard Hot 100 chart.

Content
In the song, the narrator states tells his lover that seeing each other all the time is a good thing. He goes on to tell her that they have a good thing going on.

Chart performance
"Too Much of a Good Thing" debuted at number 49 on the U.S. Billboard Hot Country Singles & Tracks for the week of June 26, 2004.

Year-end charts

References

2004 singles
Alan Jackson songs
Songs written by Alan Jackson
Song recordings produced by Keith Stegall
Arista Nashville singles
2004 songs